Tania Abitbol (born 21 January 1965) is a professional golfer from Spain.

Career
As an amateur, Abitol won the 1985 Portuguese International Ladies Amateur Championship. On the Ladies European Tour, she won the 1989 Danish Ladies Open and the 1990 WPG European Tour Classic. She was runner-up at the 1991 Valextra Classic and the 1992 Ladies English Open, both times beaten by Laura Davies. She also won the Benson & Hedges Trophy with José María Cañizares in 1990.

On the LPGA Tour, Abitbol earned a total of $140,000 in 49 starts. She finished forth at the 1994 U.S. Women's Open and was in second place after the first round of the 1995 U.S. Women's Open, but finished outside the top-10.

In 1995, she was the tour's longest driver, averaging about 267 yards, slightly longer than Laura Davies, at 265 yards.

Professional wins (4)

Ladies European Tour wins (2)
1989 Danish Ladies Open
1990 WPG European Tour Classic

Ladies Asian Golf Tour wins (1)
1992 Singapore Ladies Open

Other wins (1)
1990 Benson & Hedges Trophy (with José María Cañizares)

Team appearances
Amateur
European Lady Junior's Team Championship (representing Spain): 1986
European Ladies' Team Championship (representing Spain): 1987

References

Spanish female golfers
Ladies European Tour golfers
LPGA Tour golfers
Golfers from Madrid
1965 births
Living people